Methylamine dehydrogenase (amicyanin) (amine dehydrogenase, primary-amine dehydrogenase) is an enzyme with systematic name methylamine:amicyanin oxidoreductase (deaminating). This enzyme catalyses the following chemical reaction:

 methylamine + H2O + amicyanin  formaldehyde + ammonia + reduced amicyanin

This enzyme contains tryptophan tryptophylquinone (TTQ) co-factor.

References

External links 
 

EC 1.4.9